Chak Des Raj is a village in Phillaur tehsil of Jalandhar District of Punjab State, India. The village is administrated by a sarpanch who is an elected representative of village as per Panchayati raj (India).

Caste 
The village has population of 1147 and in the village most of the villagers are from schedule caste (SC) which has constitutes 54.32% of total population of the village and it doesn't have any Schedule Tribe (ST) population.

Education 
The village has a Punjabi Medium, co-ed upper primary with secondary/higher secondary school (Gsss Chak Des Raj School). The school provides mid-day meal and it was founded in 1986.

Transport

Rail 

Air 

References 

Villages in Jalandhar district
Villages in Phillaur tehsil